Isenburg-Büdingen was a County of southern Hesse, Germany, located in Büdingen. It was originally a part of the County of Isenburg.

There were two different Counties of the same name. The first (1341–1511) was a partition of Isenburg-Cleberg, and was partitioned into Isenburg-Büdingen-Birstein and Isenburg-Ronneburg in 1511. The second (1628–1806) was a partition of Isenburg-Büdingen-Birstein. It was partitioned between itself, Isenburg-Meerholz and Isenburg-Wächtersbach in 1673, and was mediatised to Isenburg in 1806. In 1816 Isenburg was partitioned between the Grand Duchy of Hesse-Darmstadt and the Electorate of Hesse-Kassel.

Count Ernest Casimir (1801-1848) was elevated to the rank of prince by Louis II, Grand Duke of Hesse, in 1840. Since then, the name of the branch is spelled Ysenburg and Büdingen, to distinguish it from the princes of Isenburg from the Isenburg-Birstein branch.

Counts of Isenburg-Büdingen

See also
Diether von Isenburg, son of Diether I

References

External links
Genealogy

Counties of the Holy Roman Empire
 
States and territories established in 1341